Paul Le Person (10 February 1931 in Argenteuil – 8 August 2005) was a French actor of Breton origin. He appeared in more than ninety films from 1963 to 2005.

Filmography

External links 
 

1931 births
2005 deaths
20th-century French male actors
21st-century French male actors
French male film actors
French male stage actors
French male television actors
French people of Breton descent
People from Argenteuil